Judicial corporal punishment (JCP) is the infliction of corporal punishment as a result of a sentence imposed on an offender by a court of law. The punishments include caning, bastinado, birching, whipping, or strapping. The practice was once commonplace in many countries, but over time it has been abolished in most countries, although still remaining a form of legal punishment in some countries including a number of former British colonies and Muslim-majority states.

Countries where JCP is used

Singapore's use of caning as a form of JCP became much discussed around the world in 1994 when a United States citizen, Michael Fay, was caned for vandalism. Two of Singapore's neighbouring countries, Malaysia and Brunei, also use judicial caning.

Other former British colonies which currently have judicial caning on their statute books include Barbados, Botswana, Brunei, Swaziland, Tonga, Trinidad and Tobago, and Zimbabwe.

Many Muslim-majority territories, including the United Arab Emirates, Qatar, Iran, northern Nigeria, Yemen, and Indonesia's Aceh Province, employ judicial whipping or caning for a range of offences. In April 2020, Saudi Arabia's Supreme Court abolished flogging from the country's legal system, though other forms of judicial corporal punishment, including amputation for theft, remain legal in Saudi Arabia.

Full list of countries

A list of 28 countries that use lawful, official JCP today is as follows:

  (men and women – whip or cane, no target specified; public or private). See Judicial corporal punishment in Afghanistan
  (boys only – details unclear)
  (men – cat on bare back; boys – cane on bare buttocks; in private)
  (boys only – details unclear)
  (males aged 14 to 40 – cane on bare buttocks; in private)
  (men and boys – cane on bare buttocks; in private) See Caning in Brunei.
  (boys under 16 – details unclear)
  (men and women – traditional indigenous justice)
 , Aceh Special Region only (men and women – cane on clothed back; details unclear)
  (men, women, boys, girls – whip or strap, no target specified; public or private). In Iran, they also follow eye for an eye punishment.
  (men and boys – details unclear)
  (Criminal law: men and boys – cane on bare buttocks; in private). See Caning in Malaysia. *(Sharia law, Muslims only: men and women – cane on clothed back; in private)
  (men and women – details unclear)
  (men, women – cane on clothed buttocks or whip on bare back; in public or private.)
  (men and boys – cane or strap on clothed buttocks; public or private)
  (men and women – details unclear; in private)
 : Saudi Arabia has corporal punishment. People have been whipped (before it was abolished). Some people have also had their hand amputated.
  (boys and men – details unclear)
  (boys only – cane or birch on bare buttocks)
  (men and boys – cane on bare buttocks; in private). See Caning in Singapore.
  (men and women – cane on clothed buttocks)
  (boys only – cane on bare buttocks)
  (men and boys – cane on bare buttocks; in private)
  (men – cat on bare buttocks; boys – birch or cat on bare buttocks)
  (men only – cat on bare back or birch on bare buttocks; in private)
  (details unclear)
  (Muslim men – whip on bare back; Muslim women – whip on clothed back; in private). No longer applied to non-Muslims.
  (details unclear)

The above list does not include countries where a "blind eye" is sometimes turned to unofficial JCP by local tribes, authorities, etc. including Bangladesh, India and Colombia.

History by country

Egypt
The Ancient Egyptians practised rhinectomy, punishing some offenders by cutting off their noses. Such criminals were often exiled to locations in Sinai, such as Tjaru and Rhinocorura.

Netherlands
In 1854, all forms of JCP were abolished in the Netherlands with the exception of whipping. Whipping was later abolished in 1870.

In the Wetboek van Strafrecht, article 9, this kind of punishment is not listed as primary or secondary punishment. Mainly because of human rights and/or human dignity, corporal punishment has been abolished.

South Africa
The Constitutional Court decided in 1995 in the case of S v Williams and Others that caning of juveniles was unconstitutional. Although the ruling in S v Williams was limited to the corporal punishment of males under the age of 21, Justice Langa mentioned in dicta that there was a consensus that corporal punishment of adults was also unconstitutional.

The Abolition of Corporal Punishment Act, 1997 abolished judicial corporal punishment.

United Kingdom
In the United Kingdom, JCP generally was abolished in 1948; however, it persisted in prisons as a punishment for prisoners committing serious assaults on prison staff (ordered by visiting justices) until it was abolished by section 65 of the Criminal Justice Act 1967. The last ever prison flogging happened in 1962.

Jersey, Guernsey and Isle of Man
The last birching sentence in Jersey was carried out in 1966. Birching was abandoned as a policy in 1969 but lingered on the statute books. Obsolete references to corporal punishment were removed from remaining statutes by the Criminal Justice (Miscellaneous Provisions) (No. 2) (Jersey) Law 2007.

The last birching sentence in Guernsey was carried out in 1968. The Corporal Punishment (Guernsey) Law, 1957 was finally repealed by the Criminal Justice (Miscellaneous Provisions) (Bailiwick of Guernsey) Law, 2006.

Judicial birching was abolished in the Isle of Man in 1993 following the 1978 judgment in Tyrer v. UK by the European Court of Human Rights. The last birching had taken place in January 1976; the last caning, of a 13-year-old boy convicted of robbing another child of 10p, was the last recorded juvenile case in May 1971.

United States

American colonies judicially punished in a variety of forms, including whipping, stocks, the pillory and the ducking stool. In the 17th and 18th centuries, whipping posts were considered indispensable in American and English towns. Starting in 1776, George Washington strongly advocated and utilised judicial corporal punishment in the Continental Army, with due process protection, obtaining in 1776 authority from the Continental Congress to impose 100 lashes, more than the previous limit of 39. In his 1778 Bill for Proportioning Crimes and Punishments, Thomas Jefferson provided up to 15 lashes for individuals pretending to witchcraft or prophecy, at the jury's discretion; castration for men guilty of rape, polygamy or sodomy, and a minimum half-inch hole bored in the nose cartilage of women convicted of those sex crimes. In 1781, Washington requested legal authority from the Continental Congress to impose up to 500 lashes, as there was still a punishment gap between 100 lashes and the death penalty. The Founders believed whipping and other forms of corporal punishment effectively promoted pro-social and discouraged anti-social behavior. Two later presidents, Abraham Lincoln and Theodore Roosevelt, advocated judicial corporal punishment as punishment for wife-beating.

In the United States, judicial flogging was last used in 1952 in Delaware when a wife-beater got 20 lashes. In Delaware, the criminal code permitted floggings until 1972. One of the major objections to judicial corporal punishment in the United States was that it was unpleasant to administer.

Other countries
JCP was removed from the statute book in Canada in 1972, in India in the 1950s, in New Zealand in 1941, and in Australia at various times in the 20th century according to state.

It has been abolished in recent decades in Hong Kong, Jamaica, Kenya, Sri Lanka, and Zambia.

Other countries that were neither former British territories nor Islamic states that have used JCP in the more distant past include China, Germany, South Korea, Sweden and Vietnam.

See also
 Peter Moskos, American criminologist who has advocated judicial flogging
 Police brutality

References

Corporal punishments
Punishments